Bottini is an Italian surname. Notable people with the surname include:

Alberto Bottini (born 1967), Swiss swimmer
Anna Maria Bottini (1916-2020), Italian actress
Dante Bottini (born 1979), Argentine tennis coach
Estefanía Bottini Alemany (born 1974), former professional Spanish tennis player
Gastone Bottini (born 1987), Italian footballer
Ivy Bottini (1926-2021), American activist
Marianna Bottini (1802–1858), Italian classical composer and harp teacher
Oliver Bottini (born 1965), German crime writer and non-fiction author 
Prospero Bottini (1621–1712), Italian Roman Catholic bishop
Reg Bottini (1916–1999), British trade union leader
Silvia Bottini (born 1981), Italian actress and model

Italian-language surnames